Pams (previously Pam's) is a New Zealand company, owned by Foodstuffs, which also owns the New World, Pak'n Save and Four Square supermarket chains. Pams sources and brands a wide range of supermarket goods as a house brand.

History

Pams was launched through Four Square in 1937. Its first goods were baking powder and custard powder.

In 2000 celebrity chef Jamie Oliver signed up on advertisements for Pam's, with the company also sponsoring Oliver's television show Oliver's Twist.

References

External links

 Official website

Food and drink companies of New Zealand
Food and drink companies established in 1937
Store brands
New Zealand brands
New Zealand companies established in 1937